This is a list of Theta Phi Alpha National Conventions.

National conventions

References

national convention
Lists of fraternity and sorority national conferences